Kot is the surname of a Polish szlachta (nobility) family.

The surname derives from the nickname with the literal meaning "cat". 

The first mention of the name was in the 13th century.  describes the surname in his Herbarz polski as belonging to Piława coat of arms. The Kot family uses the Doliwa, Pilawa, Rola, or Kot Morski coat of arms.

Notable persons with Kot surname
Andrzej Kot (1946–2015), Polish designer
Antoni Kot, Polish footballer
Eric Kot (born 1966), Hong Kong singer and actor
Igor Kot (born 1980), Russian footballer
Jakub Kot (born 1990), Polish ski jumper
Karol Kot (1946–1968), Polish serial killer
Maciej Kot (born 1991), Polish ski jumper 
Myroslava Kot (1933–2014), Ukrainian embroider
Natalia Kot (born 1938), Polish artistic gymnast
Serhiy Kot (1958–2022), Ukrainian historian
Stanisław Kot (1885–1975), Polish scientist and politician, member of the Polish Government in Exile
Tomasz Kot (born 1977), Polish actor
Wincenty Kot (c. 1395 – 1448) Archbishop of Gniezno and Primate of Poland, vice-cancellarius regni Poloniae.

References

Surnames
Polish noble families
Polish-language surnames